Sofia Polgar (born November 2, 1974) is a Hungarian and Israeli chess player, teacher, and artist. She holds the FIDE titles of International Master and Woman Grandmaster. A former chess prodigy, she is the middle sister of two Grandmasters, Susan and Judit. She has played for Hungary in four Chess Olympiads, winning two team gold medals, one team silver, three individual golds, and one individual bronze.

Biography
Polgar was born into a Jewish family in Budapest. She and her two sisters were part of an educational experiment carried out by their father László Polgár, in an attempt to prove that children could make exceptional achievements if trained in specialist subjects from a very early age—László's thesis being that "geniuses are made, not born". He and his wife Klara educated their three daughters at home, with chess as the specialist subject. They also taught their daughters the international language Esperanto.

In the 1986 World under-14 championship she finished second to Joël Lautier and was declared world under-14 girls champion.

In 1989, at the age of 14, she stunned the chess world by her performance in a tournament in Rome, which became known as the "Sack of Rome". She won the tournament, which included several strong grandmasters, with a score of 8½ out of 9. Her performance rating according to New in Chess was 2879, one of the strongest performances in history.

Polgar finished second to Helgi Grétarsson at the World Junior Chess Championship 1994 in Matinhos, Brazil.

She played for the Hungarian team in four chess Olympiads, winning several team and individual medals.
 1988 Chess Olympiad, (reserve) +3=3–1, team gold
 1990 Chess Olympiad, (3rd board) +11=1−1, team gold, individual gold
 1994 Chess Olympiad, (2nd board) +11=3−0, team silver, individual gold, best rating performance
 1996 Chess Olympiad, (1st board) +7=6−1, individual bronze

For a time, Polgar ranked as the sixth-strongest female player in the world. She has played very little FIDE-rated chess since 2003, and (as of January 2020) none since 2010. At one point she beat Viktor Korchnoi at a game of fast chess.

During the summer of 1993, Bobby Fischer visited László Polgár and his family in Hungary. All of the Polgar sisters (Judit Polgár, Susan Polgar and Sofia Polgar) played many games of Fischer random chess with Fischer. At one point Sofia beat Fischer three games in a row.

Personal life 

On February 7, 1999, Polgar married the Israeli Grandmaster Yona Kosashvili and moved to Israel. They have two children, Alon and Yoav. Polgar's parents later joined them in Israel. She and her family lived in Toronto, Ontario, Canada for a while so her husband could pursue his studies and medical specialty. Subsequently, in 2012 they returned to Israel and settled near Tel Aviv.

See also
 List of Jewish chess players

Notes

External links
Official website
Sofia Polgar games at 365Chess.com

1974 births
Living people
World Youth Chess Champions
Chess International Masters
Chess woman grandmasters
Hungarian female chess players
Canadian people of Hungarian-Jewish descent
Hungarian emigrants to Israel
Hungarian Jews
Israeli emigrants to Canada
Israeli Jews
Jewish Canadian artists
Jewish Canadian sportspeople
Jewish chess players
Sportspeople from Budapest
Sportspeople from Toronto
Artists from Toronto
People from Tel Aviv
Hungarian people of Israeli descent